Taldom is a town in Moscow Oblast, Russia, located  north of Moscow, on a suburban railway connecting Moscow to Savyolovo. Population: 

It was previously known as Taldom (until 1918), Leninsk (until 1929).

History
It was founded in 1677.  In 1918, it was granted town status and renamed Leninsk—the first town to be renamed after Vladimir Lenin (who was still alive then). In 1929, the original name was restored.

Administrative and municipal status
Within the framework of administrative divisions, it is, together with three urban-type settlements (Severny, Verbilki, and Zaprudnya) and a number of rural localities, incorporated as the town of oblast significance of Taldom. As a municipal division, the town of Taldom, together with the same localities, is incorporated as Taldom Urban Okrug.

Administrative and municipal history
Until 2018, Taldom was the center of Taldomsky District. As part of the reform of the administrative and municipal division of Moscow Oblast, Taldomsky District was abolished, and its territory, including the urban-type settlements of Severny, Verbilki, and Zaprudnya, and a number of rural localities, was subordinated to the town of Taldom, which at the same time was elevated to the town of oblast significance. As a municipal division, Taldomsky Municipal District was abolished, and the same territory was incorporated as Taldom Urban Okrug. The formal denomination of the area is since 2018 the town of oblast significance of Taldom with added territory.

Taldom transmitter
Taldom transmitter, the most powerful broadcasting station in the world, is located in the vicinity of Taldom.

References

Notes

Sources

Cities and towns in Moscow Oblast
Kalyazinsky Uyezd
Populated places established in 1677
1677 establishments in Russia